James Breakwell is a comedy writer best known for his Twitter account XplodingUnicorn.

Career 
In April 2016, Breakwell's tweets appeared in many online magazines and news sites.

Breakwell released his first book with BenBella Books October 10, 2017: Only Dead on the Inside: A Parent’s Guide for Surviving the Zombie Apocalypse, a mash-up of a traditional parenting advice book and a zombie survival guide. His first venture into mainstream science fiction, The Chosen Twelve, was published in January 2022. In October of 2018, he was a guest star in the unscripted Canadian podcast I hate but I love it.

Awards 
Closer Magazine named Breakwell its 2016 Blogger Dad of the Year. In 2017, he was a finalist for a Shorty Award in the parenting category.

Books

References

External links 

 

Year of birth missing (living people)
Living people
Comedy writers